Desulfobotulus alkaliphilus is a bacterium from the genus of Desulfobotulus which has been isolated from sediments from a soda lake from the Kulunda Steppe in Russia.

References

External links 
Type strain of Desulfobotulus alkaliphilus at BacDive -  the Bacterial Diversity Metadatabase

Desulfobacterales
Bacteria described in 2010